Combustion, Explosion, and Shock Waves (Russian: Fizika Goreniya i Vzryva, Физика горения и взрыва) is the English-language translated version of the Russian peer-reviewed scientific journal, Fizika Goreniya i Vzryva. It covers the combustion of gases and materials, detonation processes, dispersal and transformation of substances, and shock-wave propagation. The editor-in-chief is Anatoly A. Vasil’ev.

Abstracting and indexing
The journal is abstracted and indexed in:

According to the Journal Citation Reports, the journal has a 2020 impact factor of 0.946.

References

External links 
 

Springer Science+Business Media academic journals
Physical chemistry journals
English-language journals
Russian-language journals
Magazines published in Novosibirsk
Publications established in 1965
Nauka academic journals
Bimonthly journals